Calvin Gary Burnett (born 23 October 1990) is a Scottish cricketer who made his debut for the Scottish national side in 2011. He is a right-arm pace bowler.

Burnett was born in Dundee, and was educated at Arbroath High School. He played for the Scotland under-19s at the 2008 and 2009 editions of the ICC Europe Under-19 Championship. Burnett made his senior Scottish debut in May 2011, at the 2011 Clydesdale Bank 40. His first-class debut came in June 2013, against Australia A. Later in the year, Burnett was selected in the Scottish squad for a series against Kenya, playing an Intercontinental Cup fixture and a single Twenty20 International. In the latter game, he took 3/18 from four overs, helping to restrict Kenya to 100/8 from 20 overs.

References

External links
Player profile and statistics at CricketArchive
Player profile and statistics at ESPNcricinfo

1990 births
Living people
People educated at Arbroath High School
Scottish cricketers
Cricketers from Dundee
Scotland Twenty20 International cricketers